The men's normal hill individual ski jumping competition for the 1976 Winter Olympics was held at Seefeld. It took place on 15 February.

Results

References

Ski jumping at the 1976 Winter Olympics